Shuldham is a surname and given name. 

Notable people with the surname include:

 Edward Barton Shuldham (1837–1924), British physician and homeopath
 Molyneux Shuldham, 1st Baron Shuldham ( 1717–1798), Royal Navy officer
 Thomas Shuldham O'Halloran (1797-1870), first Police Commissioner and Police Magistrate of South Australia
 Thomas Shuldham O'Halloran (lawyer) (1865–1945), lawyer and Australian rules football administrator
 Walter Shuldham (1892–1971), English cricketer
Notable people with the given name include:

 Shuldham Redfern (1895–1985), British civil servant in the Sudan and Canada